James E. Croft (November 13, 1833 – May 26, 1914) was a soldier in the Union Army during the American Civil War who received the Medal of Honor for his actions during the Battle of Allatoona.

Croft was born in England November 13, 1833. He joined the 12th Wisconsin Light Artillery Battery from Janesville, Wisconsin in August 1862, and mustered out in June 1865.  Croft died at age 80 and was buried at Oak Hill Cemetery in Janesville. His grave can be found in block 99, lot 7, grave 1.

Medal of Honor citation
Citation:

For extraordinary heroism on 5 October 1864, while serving with Battery 12, Wisconsin Light Artillery, in action at Allatoona, Georgia. Private Croft took the place of a gunner who had been shot down and inspired his comrades by his bravery and effective gunnery, which contributed largely to the defeat of the enemy.

See also
List of Medal of Honor recipients
List of American Civil War Medal of Honor recipients: A–F

References

English-born Medal of Honor recipients
English emigrants to the United States
1833 births
1914 deaths
People from Rock County, Wisconsin
United States Army Medal of Honor recipients
Union Army soldiers
Military personnel from Wisconsin
American Civil War recipients of the Medal of Honor